Ishika (ईशिका) is a feminine given name. Notable people with the name include:

People
 Ishika Jaiswal (b. 28 July 2003), Indian-American a professional badminton player
 Ishika Taneja (b. 2 September 1994), beauty pageant contestant and businesswoman

Fictional characters
 Ishika Desai, a bogus-millionaire in 2011's Ladies vs Ricky Bahl
 Ishika Dhanrajgir, a character in 2000's Mohabbatein
 Ishika Kanojia, a character in Welcome (2007 film)
 Ishika Kashyap, a character in 2010's Sasural Genda Phool
 Ishika Patel, a love interest in 2018's Roop - Mard Ka Naya Swaroop
 Ishika, a character in 2008's Miley Jab Hum Tum

References

Indian feminine given names